Jameh Mosque of Qazvin ( – Masjid-e-Jameh Atiq Qazvin) is one of the oldest mosques in Iran, and is the grand, congregational mosque (jameh mosque) of Qazvin, in Qazvin Province, Iran.

Specifications
The oldest part of the mosque is said to have been constructed by the orders of Harun al-Rashid in 807CE. Later additions were made, the last being during the late Safavid era. The double layered main dome of the mosque is from the Seljuk era, and is locked to the public. It houses some precious examples of relief calligraphy from medieval times. Renovations have also been carried out on many sections of the mosque.

The foundation of the mosque is laid on a Zoroastrian fire temple.

In spite of the devastating Mongol invasion, the mosque still stands today in its full glory. It is still in use. Parts of the mosque have been turned into a public library.

The mosque also contains a Shabestan and Ab anbar, both now under the protection of Iran's Cultural Heritage Organization.

Part of the complex caught fire on 28 January 2013. Half of the complex was burnt and destroyed by the fire.

Gallery

See also
Architecture of Iran
History of Persian domes

9th-century mosques
Mosques in Iran
Qazvin
Tiling
Buildings and structures in Qazvin Province
Mosque buildings with domes
National works of Iran
Qazvin